P. K. Abraham was an Indian actor in Malayalam movies. He acted more than 100 Malayalam films. He was an actor who had supporting roles and character roles during the 1970s and 1980s. He had worked for Malayalamanorama.  He died in 1996

Filmography

 Kaduvathoma (1993)
 Dhruvam (1993)
 Jackpot (1993)
 Kadhaykku Pinnil (1987) as Sethumadhavan
 Kaanan Kothichu (1987)
 Shyama (1986)
 Veendum (1986)
 Nimishangal (1986) as Dr Menon
 Madhuvidhu Theerum Munpe (1985)
 Nirakkoottu (1985)
 Vellam (1985)
 Akkacheede Kunjuvava (1985)
 Sreekrishna Parunthu (1984)
 Ethirppukal (1984)
 Aksharangal (1984)
 Kadamattathachan (1984) as Bishop
 Idavelakku Sesham as Judge Balagopala Menon
 Sandarbham (1984)
 Mangalam Nerunnu (1984)
 Thathamme Poocha Poocha (1984)
 Arante Mulla Kochu Mulla (1984)
 Uyarangalil (1984)
 Umanilayam (1984) as Shivasankara Pilla
 Swarna Gopuram (1984) as Siddarthan's father
 Enne Njaan Thedunnu (1983) as Jayan
 Oru Mukham Pala Mukham (1983)
 Himam (1983) as Varma
 Nadi Muthal Nadi Vare (1983)
 Bandham (1983)
 Football (1982) as Celine's father
 Ethirppukal (1982) as Priest
 Irattimadhuram (1982) as Vakkel Mahadevan
 Ithiri Neram Othiri Kaaryam (1982)
 Panchajanyam (1982) as Sekhara Pilla
 Ee Nadu (1982) as College Principal
 Archana Teacher (1981)
 Ahimsa (1981)
 Kolilakkam (1981)
 Nidra (1981)
 Greeshmajwaala (1981) as Priest
 Venal (1981)
 Hamsageetham (1981)
 Meen (1980)
 Muthuchippikal (1980)
 Saraswatheeyaamam (1980)
 Sooryadaham (1980)
 Air Hostess (1980)
 Nattuchakkiruttu (1980)
 Paalaattu Kunjikkannan (1980)
 Aavesam (1979)
 Sarapancharam (1979)
 Amrithachumbanam (1979)
 Oru Raagam Pala Thaalam (1979)
 Vadaka Veedu (1979)
 Indradhanussu (1979) as Balan Mashu
 Lovely (1979)
 Vijayanum Veeranum (1979) as Shivasankaran
 Tharangam;; (1979)
 Bandhanam (1978)
 Jalatharangam (1978)
 Madanolsavam (1978)
 Madhurikkunna Raathri (1978)
 Vayanaadan Thampan (1978)
 Anugraham (1977) as Krishnan
 Vezhambal (1977)
 Agninakshathram (1977)
 Ashtamangalyam (1977)
 Kaduvaye Pidicha Kiduva (1977)
 Sreemad Bhagavadgeetha (1977)
 Aparaadhi (1977) as DSP
 Satyavan Savithri  (1977)
 Light House (1976)
 Themmadi Velappan (1976) as Gopalan
 Abhinandanam (1976)
 Swapnadanam (1976) as Psychiatrist
 Light House (1976) as Rajasekharan, Vikraman (double role)
 Criminals (Kayangal) (1975)
 Kaamam Krodham Moham (1975)
 Chalanam (1975)
 Yaamini (1973) as Govindan

References

External links

P K Abraham at MSI

Indian male film actors
Male actors from Kottayam
Male actors in Malayalam cinema
Living people
Year of birth missing (living people)
20th-century Indian male actors